Aguila School District 63 is a public school district based in Maricopa County, Arizona.

References

External links
 

School districts in Maricopa County, Arizona